Chris Yates may refer to:
 Chris Yates (fisherman), angler, photographer and writer
 Chris Yates (rugby league), Australian rugby league footballer
 Chris Yates (rugby union) (born 1971), New Zealand rugby union footballer
 Chris Yates (The Inbetweeners), a minor character in this British sitcom

See also
Kris Yates, fictional character in Bad Girls